In enzymology, an isoflavone 7-O-glucosyltransferase is an enzyme that catalyzes the chemical reaction

UDP-glucose + an isoflavone  UDP + an isoflavone 7-O-beta-D-glucoside

Thus, the two substrates of this enzyme are UDP-glucose and isoflavone, whereas its two products are UDP and isoflavone 7-O-beta-D-glucoside.

This enzyme belongs to the family of glycosyltransferases, specifically the hexosyltransferases.  The systematic name of this enzyme class is UDP-glucose:isoflavone 7-O-beta-D-glucosyltransferase. Other names in common use include uridine diphosphoglucose-isoflavone 7-O-glucosyltransferase, UDPglucose-favonoid 7-O-glucosyltransferase, and UDPglucose:isoflavone 7-O-glucosyltransferase.  This enzyme participates in isoflavonoid biosynthesis.

References 

 

EC 2.4.1
Enzymes of unknown structure
Isoflavonoids metabolism